Iceland participated at the 2010 Winter Olympics in Vancouver, British Columbia, Canada.

Alpine skiing

See also
 Iceland at the Olympics
 Iceland at the 2010 Winter Paralympics

References 
Iceland - Vancouver Profile". Retrieved 1 February 2010.

Nations at the 2010 Winter Olympics
2010
2010 in Icelandic sport